The Central Beskidian Piedmont is a geographical region in southeastern Poland. It lies north of the Central Beskids, and belongs to the Outer Eastern Carpathians, representing the northernmost region of the Carpathians.

Subdivision
The Central Beskidian Piedmont consists of:  

 Rożnów Piedmont (PL: Pogórze Rożnowskie)
 Ciężkowice Piedmont (PL: Pogórze Ciężkowickie)
 Strzyżów Piedmont (PL: Pogórze Strzyżowskie)
 Dynów Piedmont (PL: Pogórze Dynowskie)
 Przemyśl Piedmont (PL: Pogórze Przemyskie)
 Gorlice Depression (PL: Obniżenie Gorlickie)
 Jasło-Krosno Basin (PL: Kotlina Jasielsko-Krośnieńska)
 Jasło Piedmont (PL: Pogórze Jasielskie)
 Bukowsko Piedmont (PL: Pogórze Bukowskie)

See also
 Outer Eastern Carpathians
 Outer Subcarpathian regions

References

Mountain ranges of Poland
Mountain ranges of the Eastern Carpathians